Mohan Sundar Deb Goswami (8 August 1892 – 11 January 1948) was an Odissi musician, poet & composer, a Guru of traditional Rahasa or Rasa and film director in Odia-language films. Widely known for his efforts to keep alive the Rahasa or Rasa, a traditional theatrical form depicting the romance of Radha and Krishna, Gosain became iconic for his renditions of classical Odissi songs, including Odissi, Chhanda, Champu, Kirtana, Bhajana, Janana, etc. His renditions on gramophone records pressed under the label His Master's Voice and over All India Radio made him a household figure in Odisha. He had a major role in creating the first Odia film Sita Bibaha in the year 1936, himself directing, producing and acting in this film.

Mohan Sunder Dev Goswami awards 
An annual film award has been constituted in his name in the state of Odisha.

References

1892 births
1948 deaths
People from Puri
Indian film directors
Indian film producers
Odia film directors
Odia film producers
People from British India